2-4 Family was a rap/hip hop group, that formed in Germany in the late 1990s. The original line-up consisted of Jo O'Meara, Jay Dogg, Joseph Jazz and Essence Woods.

History
Jay Dogg and Joseph Jazz met each other in the United States Army in 1989 and became friends. They were both DJs, but decided that Dogg would be the DJ and Jazz would be the rapper. As a duo, they entered several talent competitions. When visiting Germany in 1997, they came across Essence Woods at a party. British singer Jo O'Meara was a friend of Woods, so all of them formed the group 2-4 Family in 1998.

Career
2-4 Family released their first single, "Stay", in mid-1998. The song featured lead female vocals from O'Meara, and rapping from the other three members. It peaked at #8 on the Viva Top 100. They released their album Family Business in March 1999. Along with other vocalists, 2-4 Family recorded "Hand in Hand for Children - Children of the World". A week after that had been released, "Stay" was re-released for the holiday season. 2-4 Family also joined with other vocalists to release a cover version of Wham!'s hit single "Last Christmas" under the moniker Rap Allstars. 

Shortly after this, O'Meara successfully auditioned to become a part of the soon to be created pop group S Club 7 and left 2-4 Family, leaving the group with three members. Parklane Music received a demo of "Killing Me Softly", recorded by a woman named Joanna Biscardine. She soon joined the group, and 2-4 Family released their second single, "Lean on Me" in January 1999. It peaked at #9 on the Viva Top 100, and #69 on the UK Singles Chart. 

Two months later, 2-4 Family released their last album, Family Business, which peaked at #54 on the Viva Top 100. The album contained twelve tracks, including different mixes of some of the songs. The final single by 2-4 Family was released in mid-1999, titled "Take Me Home".

Split
The group went their separate ways in early 2000. Another band with the same name was formed, but with none of the five members that had once been a part of 2-4 Family. The recreation was not working and they soon disbanded after an unsuccessful single.

Singles

References

German hip hop groups
Musical groups established in 1996
Musical groups disestablished in 2000
1996 establishments in Germany
2000 disestablishments in Germany